Harrison School District 2 is the southern school district of Colorado Springs, Colorado, United States.

 it had about 11,000 students.

List of schools

ElementaryBricker Elementary School
Centennial Elementary School
Giberson Elementary School
Monterey Elementary School
Mountain Vista Community School (K-8)
Oak Creek Elementary School
Otero Elementary School
Pikes Peak Elementary School
Sand Creek International School
Soaring Eagles Elementary School
Stratmoor Hills Elementary School 
Stratton Meadows Elementary School 
Turman Elementary School
Wildflower Elementary School

Middle
Carmel Middle School
Fox Meadow Middle School
Mountain Vista Community School (K-8)
Panorama Middle School

High
Harrison High School
Sierra High School

Charter
Atlas Preparatory Academy
James Irwin Charter Schools 
James Irwin Elementary School
James Irwin Middle School
James Irwin Charter High School
The Vanguard School

See also
List of school districts in Colorado

References

External links

School districts in Colorado
Education in Colorado Springs, Colorado
School districts established in 1874
1874 establishments in Colorado Territory